Ivan Dodig and Marcel Granollers were the defending champions, but Granollers chose not to participate this year. Dodig played alongside Rajeev Ram, but lost in the semifinals to Pierre-Hugues Herbert and Nicolas Mahut.

Herbert and Mahut went on to win the title, defeating Oliver Marach and Mate Pavić in the final, 2–6, 6–2, [10–7].

Seeds

Draw

Draw

Qualifying

Seeds

Qualifiers
  Sander Arends /  Thiemo de Bakker

Qualifying draw

References
 Main Draw
 Qualifying Draw

Doubles